Lulworth Camp is a British Army base that is home to the Armoured Fighting Vehicle Gunnery School and runs the Lulworth Ranges on the southern coast of Dorset, England. It is part of Bovington Garrison and is located on the Purbeck Ridge between the villages of East and West Lulworth. The camp lies immediately southeast of the road junction between the B 3070 and B 3071 and about a mile northeast of Lulworth Cove.

History
The camp was established in 1918 and has been in continuous use since then.

On 8 February 2023, President of Ukraine Volodymyr Zelenskyy visited the base as part of a state visit.

References

External links 

Training establishments of the British Army
Villages in Dorset